Dennis Hale is a New Zealand former international rugby league referee.

Early years
Hale began his involvement with rugby league as a player with the North Shore club. He would go on to be involved in coaching and administration with the club, before becoming a referee in 1976.

Refereeing career
Hale made his senior referee debut in 1981, five years after taking up the whistle. Besides refereeing in the Auckland Rugby League and New Zealand Rugby League competitions, Hale also controlled PNG's Cambridge Cup final in 1990, several matches in the Championship and the 1992 World Club Challenge match.

Hale retired in 1997.

International career
Hale made his international test debut in 1989 controlling a match between Papua New Guinea and Great Britain in Papua New Guinea. Great Britain felt hard done by Hale's refereeing in Papua New Guinea and at the 1992 Ashes series.

Hale would go on to referee eleven consecutive test matches. This would include six between October 1991 and October 1992 and five in the 1992 calendar year, both world records. Hale also refereed the 1992 Rugby League World Cup Final at London's Wembley Stadium between Great Britain and winners Australia. He was also one of the touch judges in the 1988 World Cup Final won by Australia at Eden Park in Auckland.

When he controlled the 1995 test at Lang Park between Australia and New Zealand, he became the first New Zealander to control an overseas test match involving New Zealand. His last international test was following the 1995 World Cup when he refereed the Final of the Emerging Nations Tournament between Ireland and the Cook Islands. Hale finished with thirteen test matches, the second most by a New Zealander after John Percival.

Personal life
Hale, a Devonport businessman, is married to Dianne, who is a former Deputy Mayor of the North Shore City Council and currently sits on the Devonport - Takapuna Local Board.

References

Living people
New Zealand rugby league referees
North Shore Albions players
Rugby League World Cup referees
New Zealand rugby league players
Year of birth missing (living people)